HMS Orlando was a Mersey-class wooden-hulled steam-powered (although fully rigged with sails) screw frigate built for the Royal Navy from 1856 to 1858 but not commissioned until 1861. Orlando and her sister ship Mersey were the longest wooden warships built for the Royal Navy. At 336 feet in length, Orlando was nearly twice the length of Victory, the flagship of Admiral Horatio Nelson at the Battle of Trafalgar. At 5,643 tons displacement, she was certainly a large and impressive looking ship in her day. She was heavily armed, and in comparison to many of her counterparts was quite fast with an approximate speed of 12½ knots, achieving 13½ on trials.

The length, the unique aspect of the ship, was actually an Achilles' heel of Mersey and Orlando. The extreme length of the ship put enormous strains on her hull due to the unusual merging of heavy machinery, and a lengthy wooden hull, resulting in her seams opening up. They were pushing the limits of what was possible in wooden ship construction:

In 1866 Orlando was laid up and was sold for breaking in 1871.

Notes

External links
 
 A picture of HMS Orlando can be found here

Orlando (1858)
Orlando (1858)
Orlando